Michelle Khine, Ph.D. is a distinguished scientist and innovator at the University of California, Irvine, co-founder of Fluxion Biosciences Inc., the scientific founder of the Shrink nano-technology platform, as well as the Assistant and Founding Professor of the School of Engineering at UC Merced. Khine, an associate biomedical engineering professor in the Henry Samueli School of Engineering, is responsible for experimenting with childhood toys Shrinky Dinks to build microfluidic channels. Her research has enabled technological advances in industries including biological research and medical diagnostics.

Khine is a widely published researcher, with multiple patents grants and honors including the 2009 MIT Technology Review: TR35 Award: Selected as Top 35 Innovator under 35 in the world. Michelle Khine is also on several review committees, most notable being the Center for Scientific Review at the National Institutes of Health.

Education
Michelle received her Bachelor of Science in 1999 and Master of Science in 2001, under Dennis Lieu, in Mechanical Engineering from University of California, Berkeley. Michelle continued her education at UC Berkeley and UCSF receiving her  PhD in 2005, under Luke P. Lee, in Bioengineering. While in graduate school, she worked at Sandia National Laboratories as a MESA Fellow as well as co-founded Fluxion Biosciences (San Francisco, Ca), which was based on her dissertation work.

Selected honors and awards

In September 2009, Michelle was honored with the 2009 MIT Technology Review TR35 Award: Selected as Top 35 Innovator under 35 in the world.

Selected peer-reviewed publications
 Ionescu-Zanetti C., Blatz A., Khine, M., "Electrophoresis-Assisted Single-Cell Electroporation for Efficient Intracellular Delivery", Biomed Microdevices. 10(1):113-6, 2008.
 Grimes A., Breslauer D.N, Long M., Pegan J., Lee L.P., Khine, M., "Shrinky-Dink Microfluidics: Rapid Generation of Deep and Rounded Patterns", Lab on a Chip. 8(1):170-2, 2008. Highlighted in Chemical and Engineering News, Chemical Technology, on the Front page of American Chemical Society Homepage, (acs.org), front page of Lab on a Chip Homepage, and Wired. Most accessed paper January 2008. Lab on a Chip
 Chen, C.S., Breslauer, D.N., Luna, J.I., Grimes, A., Chin, W.C., Lee, L.P, Khine M., "Shrinky Dink Microfluidics: 3-D Polystyrene Chips," Lab on a Chip, 8, 622–624, 2008. Highlighted in Nature Medicine (May 2008). Lab on a Chip
 Nguyen, D., Pegan, J., Sa, S., McCloskey,K.E., Manilay, J.O., Khine, M.,"Shrink-Induced Honeycomb Microwells for Uniform Embryoid Bodies" accepted to Lab on a Chip. Lab on a Chip

References

External links
 UC Merced Faculty: Michelle Khine
 UC Irvine Faculty: Michelle Khine
 MIT 2009 TR35: Michelle Khine
 Toaster oven helps researchers toy with microfluidics
 Shrink Nanotechnologies Team

Living people
Year of birth missing (living people)
American bioengineers
UC Berkeley College of Engineering alumni
University of California, Irvine faculty
Sandia National Laboratories people
Engineers from California